The Aubrey Hills in Arizona in the Lower Colorado River Valley corridor are a small, lower elevation, craggy mountain range bordering the southeast side of Lake Havasu. The range is about 16-mi (26 km) long  trending exactly northwest-by-southeast.

The southeast terminus of the range contains its highpoint, Peak 1537, ; the southeast end of the range also borders the short, west-flowing Bill Williams River. The moderate height mountains that parallel the range eastward is the Bill Williams Mountains.

References

External links
 
 Peakbagger.com: Range Coordinates, and highpoint, Peak 1537

Mountain ranges of Mohave County, Arizona
Mountain ranges of the Mojave Desert
Mountain ranges of Arizona